WZBK (1220 AM; "Rewind 92.7 & 102.3") is a radio station licensed to serve Keene, New Hampshire, United States. The station is owned by Saga Communications (through its Monadnock Radio Group) and licensed to Saga Communications of New England, LLC. It airs a classic hits format. The station was assigned the WZBK call letters by the Federal Communications Commission on August 14, 2002.

In October 2008, WZBK dropped its adult standards format in favor of a simulcast of the news/talk programming of sister station WKVT from Brattleboro, Vermont. On March 31, 2011, the simulcast of WKVT was replaced by a sports radio format, largely from ESPN Radio with a local afternoon drive show and local sports. In January 2017, the station dropped ESPN Radio for Fox Sports Radio.

On July 27, 2021, WZBK changed its format from sports to a simulcast of classic hits-formatted WKVT-FM 92.7 Brattleboro, Vermont, branded as "Rewind 92.7 & 102.3".

Translators
After a decision by the Federal Communications Commission, WZBK began broadcasting at 103.1 FM on FM translator W276CB on May 16, 2008. In January 2009, the FM simulcast was dropped and replaced by an oldies format branded as "Cool 103.1".

Until December 2018, WZBK was heard on FM translator W281AU (104.1 FM). This translator was converted to an oldies station, fed via the HD3 channel of WKNE, after WZBK signed on a new translator, W272DZ (102.3 FM); this translator was obtained in an FCC filing window that requires W272DZ to permanently be associated with WZBK.

Former logos

References

External links

Monadnock Broadcasting Group

ZBK
Cheshire County, New Hampshire
Keene, New Hampshire
Classic hits radio stations in the United States
Radio stations established in 1959
1959 establishments in New Hampshire